Meenakshi Banerjee is an Indian cyanobacteriologist and presently works as the head of the Center for Applied Algal Research at Rice University  in Houston, Texas. She is the former head of the Bioscience Department of Barkatullah University, Bhopal.

Education
Banerjee finished her schooling from Irish Convent, Loreto, in Asansol and then went ahead to take up science from Nirmala College, Ranchi University. She enrolled for a bachelor's degree at Women's College, Banaras Hindu University where she studied Botany. Her interest in the subject led her to pursue masters in Botany and this was where she developed her interest in cyanobacteria further leading her to become a cyanobacteriologist.

Career
Banerjee joined Barkatullah University as lecturer in 1989. She became a Reader in 1997 and a Professor in 2005. Presently she is Head of Bioscience Department at the university.

Recognition
Bannerjee has received various awards, including the Dr K. N. Katju state level science award for 2010.

Banerjee is a life Member of the National Academy of Sciences India.

Her current interest lies in extensive research for the propagation of rare varieties of medicinal plants on algal biofertilizers and studies of the unique cyano bacteria from diverse habitats including the cold and hot deserts where these organisms survive at the borderline of life.

References

Living people
People from Paschim Bardhaman district
Bengali scientists
Banaras Hindu University alumni
Articles created or expanded during Women's History Month (India) - 2014
20th-century Indian women scientists
Indian bacteriologists
20th-century Indian biologists
Women scientists from West Bengal
Indian women microbiologists
Year of birth missing (living people)